Smolensky is a Russian adjective referring to the city or region of Smolensk. It is also used as a surname, originally meaning someone from, or connected to, the city or the region of Smolensk. It has the (transliterated) Russian forms Smolensky (masculine), Smolenskaya (feminine), or Smolenskoye (neuter). It may refer to:

Smolensky (surname)
Smolensky District, name of several districts in Russia
Smolensky (rural locality) (Smolenskaya, Smolenskoye), name of several rural localities in Russia
Smolensky Metro Bridge, a bridge in Moscow, Russia
Smolensky Bridge, a bridge in Saint Petersburg, Russia
Smolensk Oblast (Smolenskaya oblast), a federal subject of Russia
Smolenskaya (Arbatsko-Pokrovskaya line), a station on the Arbatsko-Pokrovskaya line of the Moscow Metro
Smolenskaya (Filyovskaya line), a station on the Filyovskaya line of the Moscow Metro
Smolenskaya Mountain

See also
 
 Smolenski